Kaveri is a 1986 Indian Malayalam-language film, directed by Rajeevnath. The film stars Mammootty, Mohanlal, Adoor Bhasi and Nedumudi Venu. The film has musical score by V. Dakshinamoorthy and Ilaiyaraaja.

Plot
Kaveri is a family film of love and sacrifice.

Cast
Mammootty
Mohanlal
Adoor Bhasi
Nedumudi Venu
Premji
Sithara

Soundtrack
The music was composed by V. Dakshinamoorthy and Ilaiyaraaja and the lyrics were written by Kavalam Narayana Panicker.

References

External links
 

1986 films
1980s Malayalam-language films
Films scored by Ilaiyaraaja
Films directed by Rajeevnath